An aroma is a volatilised chemical compound that humans or other animals perceive by the sense of olfaction (the sense of smell).

Aroma may also refer to:

 Aroma Espresso Bar, an Israeli espresso bar and coffee shop chain
 Aroma, Indiana, United States
 Aroma, Missouri, United States
 Aroma (Caria), a town of ancient Caria, now in Turkey
 Aroma (winery), a Moldovan wine producer
 Aroma Province, La Paz, Bolivia
 Aroma Rural LLG, Papua New Guinea
 Aroma, Sudan, a town in Kassala State, Sudan
 Aroma of wine
 Aroma Housewares, branded as Aroma, is a cookware producer
 Aroma (skipper), a genus of skipper butterflies
 Hua Xiren, a fictional character from the Chinese novel Dream of the Red Chamber

See also
 Aromas (disambiguation)
 Aroma Park, in the U.S. state of Illinois
 Aroma Township, also in the U.S. state of Illinois
 Aromaa, Finnish surname